Anne Marit Jacobsen (born 7 November 1946) is a Norwegian stage and film actress.

She was born in Oslo as the daughter of sculptor Thorbjørn Sigurd Jacobsen and opera singer Randi Heide Steen. She has been assigned to the National Theatre in Oslo from 1970, and has also participated in revue, television and film. Among her films roles are the title character in the 1972 film Marikkens bryllup, Rakel Iversen in the 1980 film Den som henger i en tråd, and "Aunt Petra" in the 1998 film Ole Aleksander Filibom-bom-bom. She was a central actress in the award-winning television show Hilde? På TV?! at the 1986 Montreux film festival. She played the leading character "Anna Nedrebø" in the television series Vestavind in 1994/1995, and she was awarded the Gullruten award for best actress in 2006, for her role in the television series Sejer. Other awards include the Per Aabel Honorary Award (1997), Komiprisen (2003) and the Amanda Honorary Award (2016). She was decorated Commander of the Order of St. Olav in 2017.

References

1946 births
Living people
Actresses from Oslo
Norwegian stage actresses
Norwegian film actresses